London College of Fashion, UAL is a constituent college of University of the Arts London, in London, England. It offers undergraduate, postgraduate, short courses, study abroad courses and business-training in fashion, make-up, beauty-therapy and lifestyle industries. It is the only college in Britain to specialise in fashion education, research and consultancy. Its patron is Sophie, Duchess of Edinburgh. The current head of college is Professor Andrew Teverson.

History 

The origins of the London College of Fashion are in three early London trade schools for women: the Shoreditch Technical Institute Girls School, founded in 1906; the Barrett Street Trade School, founded in 1915; and the Clapham Trade School, founded in 1927. All were set up by the technical education board of the London County Council to train skilled labour for trades including dressmaking, millinery, embroidery, women's tailoring and hairdressing; to these, furriery and men's tailoring were later added. Graduates of the schools found work either in the garment factories of the East End, or in the skilled dressmaking and fashion shops of the West End of London.

After the Second World War the minimum school leaving age was 15; junior level courses at the colleges were scrapped. Barrett Street Trade School became Barrett Street Technical College, and the Shoreditch and Clapham schools were merged to form Shoreditch College for the Garment Trades. Both had the status of technical colleges, and began to take male students also. In 1967 the two colleges were merged to form the London College for the Garment Trades. This was renamed London College of Fashion in 1974.

In 1986 the London College of Fashion became part of the London Institute, which was formed by the Inner London Education Authority to bring together seven London art, design, fashion and media schools. The London Institute became a legal entity in 1988, could award taught degrees from 1993, was granted University status in 2003 and was renamed University of the Arts London in 2004.

In August 2000 Cordwainers College, a specialist school for leather-working, shoemaking and saddlery, was merged with the London College of Fashion. It was founded in Bethnal Green in 1887 as the Leather Trade School. The name was changed to Cordwainers Technical College in about 1914, and then to Cordwainers College in 1991.

In 2018, Microsoft co-created a customised curriculum with London College of Fashion. The students participating in this course used cutting-edge technology like mixed reality, the Internet of Things, and artificial intelligence for fashion innovation related to industry and consumer needs.

In 2019, the school, the London's mayor's office, Poplar HARCA (housing association) and The Trampery opened a new space to support young creative talent in East London.

In 2023, the college is due to make Stratford its new home, as part of East London's regeneration into a creative and cultural hub.

Campuses 

The main college building is in John Prince's Street, just north of Oxford Circus. Other campuses are at 272 High Holborn; 40 Lime Grove in Shepherd's Bush, and, in East London: 182 Mare Street (which was formerly home to the Lady Eleanor Holles School before it relocated to Hampton,); 100 Curtain Road (Old Street) and Golden Lane (Old Street).

Affiliations 

The London College of Fashion is a constituent college of the University of the Arts London, with Camberwell College of Arts, Central Saint Martins College of Art and Design, Chelsea College of Art and Design, London College of Communication and Wimbledon College of Art.

Notable people

Alumni

Alumni of the college include :
 Dimpy Bhalotia, Street Photographer 
 A'Whora, drag performer and fashion designer
 Jimmy Choo, shoe designer
 Ioana Ciolacu, fashion designer
 Christos Costarellos, Greek fashion designer
 Peggy Gou, DJ, record producer, fashion designer
 Emma Hope (born 1962), shoe designer
 Driss Jettou, prime minister of Morocco
 Rachel Stevens, English singer, songwriter and an actress
 Joanne Stoker, shoe designer
 Rosenthal Tee, fashion designer
 William Tempest, fashion designer
 Alek Wek, South Sudanese-British, model and designer
 Jonathan Anderson, fashion designer
 Ekaterina Malysheva, fashion designer
 Kojey Radical, musical artist
 Viking Wong, Brazilian jiu-jitsu practitioner and fashion designer

References

Fashion schools in the United Kingdom
Fashion, London College
Education in the London Borough of Hackney
Educational institutions established in 1967
1906 establishments in England